U.S. Route 78 (US 78) is a major east–west U.S. Highway across the central part of Alabama. It is internally designated State Route 4 (SR 4) by the Alabama Department of Transportation (ALDOT), though the only section of SR 4 that is signed is along portions mainly west of Jasper. The section from the Mississippi state line to near Graysville is concurrent with Interstate 22 (I-22); from Graysville south to Birmingham, US 78 takes its original routing. East of Birmingham to the Georgia state line, US 78 has been replaced as a major through-route by I-20. The two routes roughly parallel each other, with junctions at Leeds and Pell City.

West of Jasper, old US 78 is signed as SR 118 to Guin, and the segment from Guin northward to I-22 at Hamilton is signed as US 43/US 278.

Route description

I-22 concurrency

Jefferson County  
US 78 leaves its concurrency with I-22 at exit 85 and joins SR 5 near Graysville. One mile later, it has an interchange linking Graysville and West Jefferson. It then has an interchange with Hillcrest Road in Adamsville before crossing through Forestdale and Birmingham.

In the neighborhood of North Pratt, US 78/SR 5 has an interchange. The road then curves south after intersecting with SR 378. It then meets I-20/I-59 at Birmingham–Southern College. Near Legion Field, US 78 turns east along US 11, while SR 5 turns west along US 11. In the downtown area of Birmingham, US 11/US 78 split into a one-way pair where they meet with I-65. Eastbound US 78 continues east along 3rd Avenue N before turning south onto 13th Street N; westbound traffic continues west along 1st Avenue N before turning north onto 9th Street. US 78 parallels the railroads, including Amtrak's Crescent service; Amtrak trains stop at Birmingham station near 1st Avenue N and 19th Street N. US 78 turns south along 24th Street and then turns east along another one-way pair. Eastbound traffic travels along 4th Avenue S, while westbound traffic travels along 3rd Avenue S. US 31 and US 280 indirectly serve US 78 at a RIRO one block after the split. The split ends at 36th Street S. Starting in Irondale, US 78 begins to have numerous direct or indirect encounters with I-20. In Leeds, it intersects US 411/SR 119 before entering St. Clair County.

Jefferson County to Georgia state line 
US 78 parallels I-20 all the way toward Augusta, Georgia. US 78 enters I-20 at Cooks Springs and leaves the freeway at the next exit near Pell City. US 78 enters the downtown area of Pell City and intersects with US 231. After leaving Pell City and entering Riverside, US 78 finds itself paralleling the Coosa River. After meeting I-20 again, US 78 crosses over a narrow two-lane truss bridge. After crossing the river, the route enters Lincoln and eventually intersects with SR 77 near downtown. The route also enters Oxford and meets SR 202, SR 21, and US 431; US 78 meets US 431 at a one-quadrant interchange. SR 9 runs concurrently with US 78 before entering downtown Heflin. As US 78 leaves the downtown area, US 78 meets with SR 46. US 78 serves Edwardsville and Fruithurst before entering the state of Georgia.

History 
US 78 was formed in 1926 along most of its current route; at the time, it was signed as SR 51, most of SR 8, SR 40, and a part of SR 4. US 78N (former SR 8) and US 78S (former SR 4) were also formed between Heflin, Alabama and Villa Rica, Georgia. With a revised system of state routes in 1928, US 78 and US 78N were coupled with SR 4, while US 78S was coupled with SR 46. In 1934, in an effort to abandon almost all suffixed U.S. Routes, US 78S was renumbered to US 78 Alt., while US 78N became part of US 78.

The routing of US 78 in the Birmingham area has changed several times over the years. Prior to 1941, US 78 traveled along 16th Avenue Thomas before turning south along present-day US 78. The route then traveled east along 12th Avenue W, Bankhead Highway, then south along 3rd Street N, and then east along 8th Avenue N. The routing changed in 1941 to travel further along 8th Street W near Birmingham-Southern College and then turn east along 8th Avenue W, passing on the north side of historic Legion Field. Before the early 1950s, US 78 east followed a two-lane road through the heart of Graysville (Main Street) and then shared the current four-lane road until Adamsville when it became Main Street once again and then became Forestdale Boulevard near the present interchange of US 78 and Minor Parkway. The original route crossed US 78 and became Pratt Highway, which goes into the old steel mill community of Pratt City and then into Birmingham. Construction of a 4-lane routing led to a realignment of US 78. Also, US 78 was rerouted onto 3rd Avenue S east of downtown Birmingham.

In 1953, US 78 was rerouted south to bypass Anniston; part of the old alignment became SR 202. In 1957, SR 4 was rerouted north between Hamilton and Jasper to serve Natural Bridge and other towns along SR 5 and the newly extended US 278. By 1972, US 78 was rerouted to enter/exit I-20 at Cooks Springs instead of Moody.

Major intersections

References

External links

U.S. Highways in Alabama
U.S. Route 78